Sobre El Amor Y Sus Efectos Secundarios is the first studio album by the Colombian band Morat. The album was released on June 17, 2016.

Composition 
Juan Pablo described this album as a story of songs connecting one after another "that talk about different stages of love that any young person can go through, from the beginning of a relationship to the end, and the feeling of self-esteem of feeling good without that person".

Promotion 
On November 29, 2016, Morat performed Sobre el amor y sus efectos secundarios in Bataplan Disco in San Sebastián, Spain, with highlights on "Mi nuevo vicio" and "Cómo te atreves". This performance was organized by Cadena 100 as part of their 'Club 100' meetings. The invitations to attend this performance were sold out in the first day.

On March 9, 2017, Morat presented this album at a concert in Industrial Copera in Granada, Spain.

Reception 
The single "Mi Nuevo Vicio" in collaboration with Paulina Rubio achieved great success, and peaked at No.4 on Billboard on June 6, 2015. The third single "Cómo te atreves" also peaked at No.6 on Billboard on February 18, 2017. The song "Aprender A Quererte" is best known in Mexico as the theme song of the soap opera "Hijas de la luna". In addition, Morat obtained 4× Platinum Record as well as a Latin Grammy award nomination for "Cómo te atreves", and Golden Record for "Cuánto me duele".

In collaboration with Álvaro Soler, the single "Yo Contigo, Tú Conmigo (The Gong Gong Song)" was produced as the theme music of Despicable Me 3 in 2017, which was included in the re-issue of Sobre el amor y sus efectos secundarios. The single reached No.1 on radio in Spain and won the "Song of the Year" award in LOS40 Music Awards 2017.

Track listing

Charts

Weekly charts

Year-end charts

Certifications

References

2016 albums